Dr. Walter Klaus Köbel (20 March 1918 - 10 September 1965) was a German politician.

Dr. Köbel was first elected as Mayor of Rüsselsheim in 1954 at the age of 36.  In October 1963 he entered Hessian State Parliament, as a member of the SPD, and held these positions until his sudden death on 10 September 1965.

Following his death, a newly built sports hall in Rüsselsheim, was named in his honour as the Walter-Köbel-Halle. But it was renamed on 14 March 2013, when due to an historical inquiry, his former involvement in national socialist ideology became generally known.

Sources 
 Lengemann; Hessenparlament, Seite 304 (PDF-Datei; 12,31 MB)

References

1918 births
1965 deaths
Social Democratic Party of Germany politicians
Politicians from Darmstadt
Mayors of places in Hesse